Canfield High School is a public high school located in Canfield, Ohio, United States.  It is the only secondary school in the Canfield Local School District. Athletic teams compete as the Canfield Cardinals in the Ohio High School Athletic Association as a member of the All-American Conference.

Sports

OHSAA State Championships

 Football – 2022

References

External links 
Canfield High School Homepage

High schools in Mahoning County, Ohio
Public high schools in Ohio
Educational institutions in the United States with year of establishment missing